The 1990–91 season was FC Lokomotiv Gorna Oryahovitsa's fifth season in A PFG.

First-team squad 

 21/0
 30/0
 29/1 
 29/1
 26/3
 18/1
 29/4
 28/3
 30/0

 1/0
 16/0
 29/21
 5/0
 30/5
 29/1 
 12/2
 9/0
 3/0

Fixtures

League

The team is finished 8th after 30 games in his fifth "A"group's season.

League standings

Bulgarian Cup

1/16 finals

Lokomotiv GO loss with aggregate: 0–6.

References

External links
 1990–91 A PFG
 Lokomotiv Gorna Oryahovitsa official website

FC Lokomotiv Gorna Oryahovitsa seasons
Lokomotiv Gorna Oryahovitsa